Tristram Tupper Hyde (July 3, 1862 – January 27, 1931) was the mayor of Charleston, South Carolina, from 1915 to 1919.

Early life 
Tristram was the son of Simeon Hyde and Ann Elizabeth Tupper. He attended the High School of Charleston. He married Minnie D. Black in 1886 and Sue Estelle Thomas 1907.

Hyde was a real estate broker with Eben Coffin and Co. and then Tristram T. Hyde and Sons. He was also president of Commercial Savings Bank, White Swan-Ideal Laundry and Francis Marion (Hotel]) Corporation.

Mayor 

In 1915, supported by former Mayor R. Goodwyn Rhett, Hyde ran against incumbent John P. Grace for mayor. Hyde was supported by the Charleston elites in his race against Grace who was considered a populist. Hyde won the election by a mere margin of 14 votes. Three days later, an Election recount was held on the corner of King St. and George St. which resulted in the shooting death of a News and Courier reporter, Sidney J. Cohen. Grace conceded the election shortly afterwards.

Hyde was fiscally conservative and sought to lower government expenditure. In contrast to Grace, Hyde was tough on bootleggers. In 1919, Grace and Hyde squared off again in another close election. Hyde lost by a small margin.

One notable development of Hyde's tenure in office was the ceding of a large portion of Hampton Park to the state for use in building a new campus for The Citadel so that the school remained in Charleston. He also aided in the formation of a public waterworks.

In private affairs, he was engaged in diverse business interests including being one of the principal backers of the company that built the Fort Sumter Hotel on the Battery.

Later life 
He is buried at Magnolia Cemetery (Charleston, South Carolina).

References

Further reading
Geddings Hardy Crawford. Who's Who in South Carolina. A Dictionary of Contemporaries Containing Biographical Notices of Eminent Men of South Carolina. Columbia, 1921. 
Year Book 1919, City of Charleston.Charleston, 1920.

Mayors of Charleston, South Carolina
1862 births
1931 deaths
American bank presidents
American real estate businesspeople
Politicians from Columbia, South Carolina
Burials in South Carolina
20th-century American politicians